is a passenger railway station in located in the city of Iga,  Mie Prefecture, Japan, operated by the private railway operator Kintetsu Railway.

Lines
Aoyamachō Station is served by the Osaka Line, and is located 77.9 rail kilometers from the starting point of the line at Ōsaka Uehommachi Station.

Station layout
The station consists of two island platforms, connected by an underground passage.

Platforms

Adjacent stations

History
After merging with Osaka Electric Kido on March 15, 1941, the line became the Kansai Express Railway's Osaka Line. This line was merged with the Nankai Electric Railway on June 1, 1944, to form Kintetsu. The station was renamed to its present name on March 1, 1970.

Passenger statistics
In fiscal 2019, the station was used by an average of 940 passengers daily (boarding passengers only).

Surrounding area
Sakuragaoka Junior & Senior High School

See also
List of railway stations in Japan

References

External links

 Kintetsu: Aoyamachō Station

Railway stations in Japan opened in 1930
Railway stations in Mie Prefecture
Stations of Kintetsu Railway
Iga, Mie